Niroshan S de Silva (born 29 August 1971) is a Sri Lankan-born American former cricketer.

The son of the Test cricketer Somachandra de Silva, he was born at Colombo in August 1971. He played minor counties cricket in England for Shropshire from 1999, making a single appearance in the MCCA Knockout Trophy. He later moved to the United States, where he played a single List A one-day match for the United States against Barbados at Jamaica in the 2000–01 Red Stripe Bowl. He took a single wicket in the match with his leg break bowling, dismissing Dale Richards to finish with match figures of 1 for 17 from six overs. His uncles, Hemachandra de Silva and Premachandra de Silva, were also cricketers.

References

External links

1971 births
Living people
People from Colombo
Sri Lankan cricketers
Shropshire cricketers
Sri Lankan emigrants to the United States
American cricketers